London Buses route X26 is a Transport for London contracted bus route in London, England. Running between Heathrow Airport and West Croydon bus stations, it is operated by London General. It is the longest bus route currently operating in London, covering a distance of 23.75 miles, albeit with limited stops.

History

Route X26 has its origins in Green Line Coach route 725, which started in the 1950s and ran from Gravesend and Dartford through Sidcup, Bromley, Croydon, Sutton and Kingston to Staines and Windsor. In the late 1970s route 726 was introduced as a variant, from Gravesend to Windsor via Heathrow Airport and Slough instead of Staines.

By the 1980s, the sections of route between Heathrow and Windsor and between Gravesend and Dartford had been withdrawn. At that time the Green Line network was operated by London Country Bus Services, but when that company was broken up in 1986 route 726, which ran almost entirely within Greater London, came under the control of London Country North West (LCNW) and Kentish Bus & Coach. In 1991 LCNW planned to withdraw the route, but London Regional Transport stepped in and took the route over. LCNW continued to operate the route on a short term one-year contract. On 29 February 1992, London Coaches, a subsidiary of London Buses privatised in 1992, commenced operating the route using dual-purpose DAF SB220 vehicles.

The contract changed from London Coaches to Capital Logistics in the late 1990s, and passenger numbers continued to decline. By 1997, London Transport attempted to withdraw the service, but at the end of year it was given an 18-month reprieve after over 1,600 letters had been received in its support.

Early in 1999 the service was cut back to run between Bromley and Heathrow only; the service became hourly, with no early morning or late evening service. Capital Logistics was bought by Tellings-Golden Miller on 1 June 1999, shortly after a new contract for the 726 had been awarded. New low-floor buses were specified, and seven Alexander ALX300 bodied Volvo B10BLEs were purchased.

In April 2005 route 726 was renumbered X26 and the section between Bromley and East Croydon was withdrawn, rerouted to run via Teddington instead of Hampton Court, and many stops were removed to reduce run times and improve reliability. The contract was awarded to Metrobus, which used Scania OmniCity vehicles. London Buses hoped that the re-modelled route would attract more passengers and therefore specified large single-deck buses. It was initially intended to remove stops at Carshalton, Cheam, North Cheam and Worcester Park, but these were retained. The peak vehicle requirement (PVR) fell from six buses to four.

On 22 November 2008, route X26 was doubled in frequency to every 30 minutes for most of the day, including Sundays, although the evening service remained hourly. To cover for the increase in PVR while new vehicles were prepared, Metrobus hired Mercedes-Benz O530s from Wealden PSV, delivered directly from original owner Quality Line. The Citaros have since been returned to Wealden PSV and replaced with Scania OmniCitys from the Crawley Fastway network, refurbished and painted red; these are two years older than the OmniCitys that previously worked on the route.

In June 2010, a proposal to reintroduce the former 726 stop at Beddington was rejected by Transport for London, despite support from many residents. Upon being re-tendered, on 14 April 2012 the route passed to Quality Line with new Mercedes-Benz O530s. On 15 April 2017 it was taken over by London General with double deck buses introduced.

Current route
Route X26 operates via these primary locations:
Heathrow Central bus station      
Hatton Cross station  
Teddington Broad Street
Kingston Wood Street
Kingston Cromwell Road bus station  
New Malden Fountain Roundabout
Worcester Park 
North Cheam Queen Victoria
Cheam Broadway
Sutton Town Centre 
Carshalton High Street
Wallington Wallington Green
East Croydon station  
West Croydon bus station

References

External links

Bus routes in London
Green Line Coaches routes
Transport in the London Borough of Croydon
Transport in the London Borough of Hillingdon
Transport in the Royal Borough of Kingston upon Thames
Transport in the London Borough of Richmond upon Thames
Transport in the London Borough of Sutton
X26